The 2000–01 Scottish Premier League (known as the 2000–01 Bank of Scotland Premier League for sponsorship reasons) was the third season of the Scottish Premier League, the top level of football in Scotland. It began on 29 July 2000 and concluded on 20 May 2001.

Rangers were the defending champions.

Celtic finished the season as league champions by a 15-point margin over Rangers, also winning both of the domestic cups to complete a domestic treble, in their first season under the management of Martin O'Neill.

Changes from 1999–2000 season
2000–01 saw the Scottish Premier League (SPL) expanded from 10 to 12 clubs, which was part of the agreement reached between the clubs in the SPL and the Scottish Football League when the top-tier clubs broke away in 1998.

With the expansion of the league, the league 'split' was introduced to avoid the need for clubs to play 44 fixtures in a season, which would be the case if the quadruple round-robin format of the previous season was followed. Instead, after 33 rounds of matches, by which time all clubs had played each other three times, the league split into a 'top six' and 'bottom six' with clubs only competing against teams within their own section for the final five fixtures.  Points achieved during the first phase of 33 matches were carried forward to the second phase but after the first phase was completed, clubs could not move out of their own section in the league, even if they achieved more or fewer points than a higher or lower ranked team, respectively. The new format received widespread criticism from SPL managers.

Results in European competition over the previous five years saw the league move up from 21st to 15th in the UEFA country coefficient ranking. This meant that the league was granted an additional berth in the UEFA Champions League qualifying rounds for the following season.

Teams
Twelve clubs competed in the league, all of the participants in the 1999–2000 Scottish Premier League and the top two clubs in the 1999–2000 Scottish First Division. A play-off was due to take place between the bottom club of the Premier League (Aberdeen) and the second- and third-placed club of the First Division (Dunfermline Athletic and Falkirk, respectively), but as Falkirk's stadium did not meet the minimum SPL seating requirements, this play-off did not take place, and Aberdeen and Dunfermline were automatically placed in the Premier League.

St Mirren were promoted to the league as champions of the 1999–2000 First Division, securing the championship on 29 April 2000 with a 3–0 victory over Raith Rovers at Love Street. This was to be their first season at the top level of Scottish football since 1991–92.

Stadia and locations

Personnel and kits

Managerial changes

Overview
The 2000–01 title was won by Celtic - their first SPL title, and their first Scottish title since winning the 1997–98 Premier Division – in Martin O'Neill's first season as manager of the club. Celtic also went on to win the 2000–01 Scottish Cup and the 2000–01 Scottish League Cup, completing a domestic treble. Henrik Larsson won the 2000–01 European Golden Shoe for his goalscoring, scoring 35 league goals and 53 goals in all competitions over the course of the season. The 35 goals Larsson scored in the league this season was a Scottish Premier League record.

Defending champions Rangers finished second, 15 points behind their Old Firm-rivals. Celtic secured their title on 7 April 2001, with a 1–0 victory over St Mirren at Celtic Park. The aforementioned match had the highest attendance of any match in SPL history. As champions, Celtic qualified for the Champions League, as did second-placed Rangers. Third-placed Hibernian and fourth-placed Kilmarnock qualified for the UEFA Cup, while Dundee became the first SPL club - and the first Scottish club since Partick Thistle in 1995 - to qualify for the UEFA Intertoto Cup.

The record for the highest transfer fee ever paid by a Scottish club was broken twice over the course of the season. Firstly, by Chris Sutton's transfer from Chelsea to Celtic on 10 July 2000 for £6 million. Then, on 23 November 2000, the £12 million fee paid by Rangers to Chelsea for Tore André Flo became the highest transfer fee ever paid by a Scottish club, and is a record which still stands as of 2021. The signing of Claudio Caniggia for Dundee in October 2000 was also seen by many as a major coup for the club, and was just one of many signings of international players made under the management of Ivano Bonetti.

St Mirren were relegated in what was their debut season in the SPL and their first appearance in Scotland's top division since 1991–92. Their relegation was mathematically confirmed on the final day of the season with a 3–3 draw against Motherwell, leaving them five points below 11th-placed Dundee United.

League table

Results

Matches 1–22
During matches 1–22 each team played every other team twice (home and away).

Matches 23–33
During matches 23–33 each team played every other team once (either at home or away). This means that during matches 1-33 each team played every other team 3 times (either 1 home, 2 away or 2 home, 1 away).

Matches 34–38
During matches 34–38 each team played every other team in their half of the table once (either at home or away).

Top six

Bottom Six

Top scorers

Source: SPL official website

Attendances
The average attendances for SPL clubs during the 2000/01 season are shown below:

Source: SPL official website

Monthly awards

See also
2000–01 Celtic F.C. season
2000–01 Rangers F.C. season
Dundee United FC Season 2000-01

References

Season Review - ScotPrem.co.uk

Scottish Premier League seasons
1
Scot